Solnechny is an urban-type settlement and the administrative center of Solnechny District, Khabarovsk Krai, Russia. Population:

References

Notes

Sources

Urban-type settlements in Khabarovsk Krai